Khat is a flowering plant chewed for its stimulant effects.

Khat may also refer to:
 Khat, four-footed bed from north India
 Khat (apparel), the headcloth worn by Ancient Egyptian Pharaohs
 Khat, an alternative name for the village Hat, Azerbaijan
 KHAT, a radio station broadcasting in Laramie, Wyoming
 Khatt, Islamic calligraphy or Arabic calligraphy

See also
 Catechu, a stimulant sometimes referred to as "kath", completely unrelated to khat
 Khatt, a village in United Arab Emirates